Rock Hill Farm is a historic home and farm located near Bluemont, Loudoun County, Virginia.  The original section of the house was built about 1797, and has undergone at least four additions and renovations about 1873, 1902, 1947, and 1990.  It is two-story, stuccoed stone, Quaker plan, Federal style  dwelling with a gable roof.  Also on the property are the contributing two-story, wood-frame bank barn (c. 1797); one-story, pyramidal-roofed, stucco-finished smokehouse (c. 1797); a two-story, gable-roofed, stucco and frame garage (c. 1797); one story, gable-roofed, wood-frame corncrib (c. 1873); one-story, gable-roofed, wood-frame office/dairy (c. 1873); a fieldstone run-in shed (c. 1873); a one-story, gable roofed, wood-frame stable (c. 1950); the remains of a formal boxwood garden (c. 1950); several ca. 19th-century, dry-laid, fieldstone fences (contributing); and a cemetery (c. 1820).

It was listed on the National Register of Historic Places in 2009.

References

Houses on the National Register of Historic Places in Virginia
Farms on the National Register of Historic Places in Virginia
Federal architecture in Virginia
Houses completed in 1797
Houses in Loudoun County, Virginia
National Register of Historic Places in Loudoun County, Virginia